Millu Urqu Quechua millu salty, urqu mountain, "salty mountain", also spelled Millu Orkho) is a  mountain in the Andes of Bolivia. It is situated in the Potosí Department, Nor Lípez Province, Quemes Municipality. Millu Urqu lies southwest of Chakra Urqu and Kachi Unu and northwest of Chiwana.

References 

Mountains of Potosí Department